Panyjima (Banyjima, Panytyima) may be,

 Panyjima people
 Panyjima language